Hualqui is a Chilean city and commune in the Concepción Province, Biobio Region.  It is also part of the Greater Concepcion conurbation, although it maintains a rural profile.  It had a population of 24,333 inhabitants according to the 2017 census.

Its name comes from the Moluche Aillarehue and rehue of Hualqui that existed there at the beginning of the Conquest of Chile. In the beginning of 1756 Governor Manuel de Amat y Juniet erected a town there, named San Juan Bautista de Gualqui. It served as capital to the Corregimiento de Puchacay and then Partido de Puchacay until 1799.

Demographics
Of these, 20,889 (85.8%) lived in urban areas and 3,444 (14.2%) in rural areas. The population grew by 16.2% (2,612 persons) between the 1992 and 2002 censuses.

Administration
As a commune, Hualqui is a third-level administrative division of Chile administered by a municipal council, headed by an alcalde who is directly elected every four years. The 2008-2012 alcalde is Ricardo Fuentes Palma (Ind.).

Within the electoral divisions of Chile, Hualqui is represented in the Chamber of Deputies by Sergio Bobadilla (UDI) and Clemira Pacheco (PS) as part of the 45th electoral district, (together with Tomé, Penco, Florida, Coronel and Santa Juana). The commune is represented in the Senate by Alejandro Navarro Brain (MAS) and Hosain Sabag Castillo (PDC) as part of the 12th senatorial constituency (Biobío-Cordillera).

References 

  Francisco Solano Asta-Buruaga y Cienfuegos, Diccionario geográfico de la República de Chile, D. Appleton y Compania, Nueva York, 1899, Pg.293 Gualqui. — Villa

External links
  Municipality of Hualqui

Communes of Chile
Geography of Biobío Region
Populated places in Concepción Province
1577 establishments in the Spanish Empire